Super is a 2005 Indian Telugu-language heist action film written and directed by Puri Jagannadh. It was produced by Nagarjuna on Annapurna Studios banner. The film starred Nagarjuna, Anushka Shetty, Sonu Sood, and Ayesha Takia in lead roles and music was composed by Sandeep Chowta. Super marked the acting debut of Anushka Shetty and is also the Telugu film debut of Ayesha Takia. 

Upon release the film had a mixed response by the critics. Super was an average grosser at the box office. The film was partially reshot in Hindi as Robbery and dubbed into Tamil with the same title.

Plot 
Akhil owns a call cab service, who soon falls in love with a doctor named Srivalli, who soon falls in love with Akhil as well. Sonu is a big-time hi-tech robber, who used to work for Siri's father as a car mechanic and so he adopts her as his sister after their family falls into bad times. Incidentally, Akhil and Sonu are enemies. When Sonu realizes that Siri is deeply in love with Akhil, he asks her to put an end to their relationship and to never see him again. Siri goes to Akhil's house to find out why Sonu and he are enemies. Akhil reveals that he and Sonu were best friends who met as recent graduates. They struggled to get a job along with Sonu's real sister Sasha, who was also a graduate. When Sasha suffered from appendicitis, they started robbing and managed to pay for surgery. After that, they decided to continue robbing banks and steal lots of money. Sasha fell in love with Akhil and proposed to him for marriage, but Akhil refused as he liked Sasha as her best friend but not as a girlfriend. One day, Sasha was found dead on the road by Sonu and Akhil with her arm slightly cut and died from blood loss where they assumed she committed suicide. Because of this, Sonu blames Akhil for her death and starts hating him. This causes their friendship to end.

Due to this, Akhil decided to live a normal life. The artist who's trying to draw a picture of Sonu, ends up drawing Akhil's picture. The police arrest Akhil, who also looks like one of the mysterious guys from a police surveillance video. According to the video, it is revealed that Sasha was murdered. Akhil lies to the cops that he's not in the video. The artist says that Akhil's not a thief. Sonu follows Akhil to the Biker's club. Akhil and Sonu realize that the Biker's club owner Mama is responsible for their robberies and Sasha's death. Sasha was at the club late, where she finds out that Mama's men are the ones who told them to rob the diamonds. 

The goons planned to kill the trio (Akhil, Sonu, and Sasha) right after they succeed in the robbery. Sasha escapes, but the goons kills her and makes Akhil and Sonu believe that she committed suicide. After Sonu learns about the truth, he reconciles with Akhil, but Mama reveals he kidnapped Siri and tells Akhil and Sonu to rob the same diamonds which they were  supposed to rob in Mumbai. They successfully rob the diamonds by blowing up underneath the truck carrying the diamonds (inspired by The Italian Job) and falling into the sea. Akhil dives into the ocean and retrieves the diamonds. 

The cops chases Sonu and Akhil on motorboats. One of the cops shoots Sonu, who falls into the ocean. Akhil does not stop and heads over to Mama's place. Akhil gets a hold of Sonu, who was wearing a bullet-proof vest. Sonu, (who is alive) rushes to save Siri from Mama's clutches. Akhil and Sonu manage to kill everyone and keep the diamonds. The artist finally draws Sonu's picture, but the police don't believe the artist, and that the captain already got transferred to another town. Akhil and Sonu give a diamond to the artist to draw a picture of Akhil & Siri, to which the artist tells that he learned to draw in prison.

Cast
 Nagarjuna Akkineni as Akhil
 Anushka Shetty as Sasha
 Sonu Sood as Sonu
 Ayesha Takia as Srivalli aka "Siri"
 Sayaji Shinde as a cop
 Piyush Mishra as Mama 
 Brahmanandam as Lie-detector expert
 Ali as John Abraham, an artist
 Sunil as news reporter
 Venu Madhav as Tattoo designer
 Khayyum as Akhil's friend
 Paruchuri Venkateswara Rao as Siri's father 
 Sumitra as Akhil's mother
 Amit Tiwari as Eve teaser

Soundtrack

Music composed by Sandeep Chowta. Music was released by MARUTHI Music Company.

Accolades 
This movie was nominated for seven categories at the South Filmfare Awards in 2006.

Notes

References

External links

 

2005 films
Indian heist films
Films shot in India
Films set in Goa
Films set on beaches
2000s Telugu-language films
Films directed by Puri Jagannadh
Indian action films
2005 action films
2000s heist films
Films scored by Sandeep Chowta